Kannonselkä (also called Kannonjärvi) is a medium-sized lake of Central Finland in the Kymijoki main catchment area. It is in the area of Kannonkoski municipality. The lake is in quite natural condition and there are good possibilities for fishing. There are several archaeological settlement places in Otaniemi on the lake shore.

References

See also
List of lakes in Finland

Lakes of Kannonkoski